The Yellow Cameo is a 1928 American adventure film serial directed by Spencer Gordon Bennet. The film is now considered to be lost.

Cast
 Allene Ray as Kay Cottrell
 Edward Hearn as Terry Lawton
 Cyclone the Dog as Cyclone, the Dog
 Noble Johnson as Smoke Dawson
 Tom London as Spraker
 Harry Semels as Black Gavin
 Frederick Dana as Sheriff
 Walter Shumway as Deputy Sheriff
 Frances Wilbur Winseman as Train Station Manager

See also
 List of film serials
 List of film serials by studio

References

External links

1928 films
American silent serial films
1928 adventure films
American black-and-white films
Lost American films
Pathé Exchange film serials
Films directed by Spencer Gordon Bennet
1928 lost films
Lost adventure films
1920s American films
Silent adventure films